The Lads Society is a far-right white nationalist extremist group founded by several former members of the United Patriots Front (UPF) in late 2017, with club houses in Sydney and Melbourne. The Lads Society came to national prominence after it staged a rally in St Kilda, Victoria, targeting the local African Australian community. Attendees were seen making the Nazi salute and one was photographed brandishing an SS helmet. 

In 2017, the group's leader, New Zealand-born Thomas Sewell asked Brenton Harrison Tarrant (the perpetrator of the 2019 Christchurch mosque shootings) to join the Lads Society, but Tarrant refused. The group's members and allies attempted to infiltrate the Young Nationals in New South Wales, and engaged in branch stacking at the May 2018 conference. Lads Society members attained leadership positions in the Young Nationals, but were later forced out of the party. The Melbourne Chapter has since become the National Socialist Network.

History

In 2017, members of the United Patriots Front, Blair Cottrell, Neil Erikson, Chris Shortis and former UPF lieutenant Thomas Sewell, along with Nathaniel Anderson and Jacob Hersant, members of the neo-Nazi Antipodean Resistance, were involved in the creation of the Lads Society, a private far-right men-only club, with a base in Melbourne.

A Sydney club followed in April 2018, while there were plans to expand into other states. The clubs include a boxing gym where weekly "fight nights" take place and a library.

In 2018, a local Sydney community group called Ashfield Community Action (ACA) formed to oppose the Lads Society. The group distributed posters which aimed to warn the suburb's residents about the group, stating that "The Sydney Branch is known to be led by committed Nazis", and that the organisation "has attracted the interest of hundreds of hard line far-right racists from around Australia". It accused the group of "training white men for racist violence" and called for it to be "shut down as soon as possible".

Lads Society members provided a security detail for far-right white nationalist Lauren Southern during her 2018 Australian tour. Photos from the event show members displaying the white power symbol hand sign gang signal.

In early January 2019, Erikson and Cottrell promised to unleash a Cronulla-style race riot on Melbourne. During the rally a significant number of participants were documented giving Nazi salutes.

Undated videos leaked to the press in November 2019 revealed Sewell's aim to attract and recruit members from mainstream society under the guise of a men's fitness club. His white supremacist agenda was clearly shown as he outlined plans which included the creation of “Anglo-European” enclaves in Australian cities, encouraging the “speed and ferocity of the decay” of society to help foment a "race war" by such tactics as exploiting the "African gangs" trope used by Home Affairs Minister Peter Dutton and other mainstream politicians.

National Socialist Network

In January 2021, a new group called National Socialist Network had surfaced with a large number of members from the Lads Society and Antipodean Resistance attending their first public event. This marked a transition of the Melbourne Chapter of the Lads Society to form the National Socialist Network. Over the Australia Day weekend, 38 members of Sewell's National Socialist Network chanted "white power" and shouted Sieg Heil and other racist slogans at passers by. The group were photographed throwing roman salutes and holding a cross burning — a ritual usually associated with the Ku Klux Klan — next to Lake Bellfield at the foot of the Grampians in western Victoria. The groups actions drew the attention of local police and intelligence officers from Victoria Police's Counter-Terrorism Command.

On 1 March 2021, Thomas Sewell and another man with a camera tried to enter the Nine Network building in Melbourne, Australia. At the entrance to the building, they were met with a black security guard. The security guard attempted to escort the two men away from the building, but they eventually attacked the security guard and screamed racial slurs at him during the ordeal. Their venture to the building came when the network was due to air a television special about their group on A Current Affair, one of the network's segments.

See also

References

Further reading
Perspectives on Terrorism

External links
Lads Society Official Website

2017 establishments in Australia
Alt-right organizations
Anti-immigration politics in Australia
Islamophobia in Australia
Neo-Nazi organizations
Neo-Nazism in Australia
Organisations based in Victoria (Australia)
Persecution of Muslims